Vinoo Mankad Trophy is a national level under 19 age group One-day cricket tournament of India. Board of Control for Cricket in India organise it. It involves junior teams of affiliated state cricket association of BCCI. The tournament is named after the Indian former cricketer Vinoo Mankad.

References

Indian domestic cricket competitions
Youth sport in India